Keijo Helmer Kuusela (6 January 1921 in Tampere, Finland – 27 April 1984) was a professional ice hockey player who played in the SM-liiga. He played for Hämeenlinnan Tarmo. He was inducted into the Finnish Hockey Hall of Fame in 1985. He also competed in the men's field hockey tournament at the 1952 Summer Olympics.

Kuusela served as a fighter pilot in World War II, flying Morane-Saulnier 406 fighter. He shot down one Soviet P-39 Airacobra fighter in his last aerial combat before colliding with another and parachuting and becoming prisoner of war 1944.

References

External links
 
 Finnish Hockey Hall of Fame bio

1921 births
1984 deaths
Finnish ice hockey players
Ice hockey players at the 1952 Winter Olympics
Olympic ice hockey players of Finland
Ice hockey people from Tampere
Finnish male field hockey players
Olympic field hockey players of Finland
Field hockey players at the 1952 Summer Olympics
Finnish World War II pilots
Shot-down aviators
Finnish prisoners of war
World War II prisoners of war held by the Soviet Union